A veintena is the Spanish-derived name for a 20-day period used in pre-Columbian Mesoamerican calendars. The division is often casually referred to as a "month", although it is not coordinated with the lunar cycle. The term is most frequently used with respect to the 365-day Aztec calendar, the xiuhpohualli, although 20-day periods are also used in the 365-day Maya calendar (the Mayan tun), as well as by other Mesoamerican civilizations such as the Zapotec and Mixtec. 

The 365-day cycle is divided into 18 veintenas of 20 days each, giving 360 days; an additional 5 "nameless days" or nemontemi are appended to bring the total to 365.

The name used for these periods in pre-Columbian times is unknown. In Nahuatl, the word for "twenty days" is cempōhualilhuitl  from the words cempōhualli  "twenty" and ilhuitl  "day". Through Spanish usage, the 20-day period of the Aztec calendar has become commonly known as a veintena. The Aztec word for moon is metztli, and this word is today to describe these 20-day periods, although as the sixteenth-century missionary and early ethnographer, Diego Durán explained:

In ancient times the year was composed of eighteen months, and thus it was observed by these Indian people.  Since their months were made of no more than twenty days, these were all the days contained in a month, because they were not guided by the moon but by the days; therefore, the year had eighteen months.  The days of the year were counted twenty by twenty.

Each 20-day period started on a Cipactli (Crocodile) day of the tonalpohualli for which a festival was held. The eighteen veintena are listed below. The dates in the chart are from the early eyewitnesses, Diego Durán and Bernardino de Sahagún. Each wrote what they learned from Nahua informants. Sahagún's date precedes the Durán's observations by several decades and is believed to be more recent to the Aztec surrender to the Spanish. Both are shown to emphasize the fact that the beginning of the Native new year became non-uniform as a result of an absence of the unifying force of Tenochtitlan after the Mexica defeat.

See also
Aztec calendar

References

Mesoamerican calendars